The 2016 William Hill Greyhound Derby took place during May and June with the final being held on 4 June 2016 at Wimbledon Stadium. Jaytee Jet won the final and the winning owner John Turner received £150,000.

Final result 
At Wimbledon (over 480 metres):

Distances 
Neck, short head, 1, ½, neck (lengths)
The distances between the greyhounds are in finishing order and shown in lengths. One length is equal to 0.08 of one second.

Race Report
Hiya Butt broke well and led until nearing the finishing line before being caught by Jaytee Jet who had stayed wide and ran on strongly. Lenson Rocky moved wide at the start hampering the other three contenders which denied Droopys Roddick the chance of the title after he finished strongly.

Quarter finals

Semi finals

See also 
 Greyhound racing
 2016 UK & Ireland Greyhound Racing Year

References

Greyhound Derby
English Greyhound Derby
English Greyhound Derby
English Greyhound Derby
English Greyhound Derby
English Greyhound Derby